Ryde St John's Road is a railway station on the Island Line, and serves the town of Ryde, Isle of Wight.

History
When the station opened in 1864, it was known as Ryde railway station, as it was the northern terminus of the Isle of Wight Railway at the time. Rather than a railway, a tramway continued northwards to where the current Ryde Pier Head railway station stands; the railway was extended to Ryde Pier in 1880.

Stationmasters

Mr. Wells until 1865
Robert Edward Wright 1865 - 1868 (formerly station master at Shanklin)
Mr. Hopgood until 1874
Charles Penty 1871 - 1874 (formerly station master at Shanklin)
Mark Gregory 1874 - 1890 (afterwards station master at Sandown)
Albert Shaw from 1890 (formerly station master at Sandown)
Walter Daish  ca. 1894 - 1908 (afterwards station master at Brading)
Charles Herbert Colenutt 1908 - 1913 (afterwards station master at Shanklin)
George Henry French 1913 - 1930 (also station master at Ryde Esplanade and Ryde Pier Head)
Malcolm J. Bucket 1930 - 1931 (formerly station master at Fratton, also station master at Ryde Esplanade and Ryde Pier Head)
H.E. Millichap ca. 1935 - 1941 (also station master at Ryde Esplanade and Ryde Pier Head)
T.F. Thompson 1941 - 1949 (also station master at Ryde Esplanade and Ryde Pier Head)
T. Rowley Cliff ca. 1951

Depot and signalling
Adjacent to the railway station is Ryde Traincare Depot: the Island Line's traction maintenance depot, where the maintenance and storage of the Island Line's Class 484 trains takes place. Since 1989, signalling for the Island Line has been centralised to the station's signal box.

Future developments
It has been suggested that the Isle of Wight Steam Railway might be extended from Smallbrook Junction to Ryde St John's Road in the future, but there are currently no official proposals.

Services
As of May 2022, there are two trains in each direction per hour during the peak and one during the off-peak. Services call at all stations except Smallbrook Junction, which operates only during steam operating dates and times, and only one service an hour calls at Ryde Pier Head. In addition, two early morning services and one late evening service operate with Ryde only, the morning 06:05 departure to Ryde Espalande being the UK's shortest distance rail service.

Gallery

References

External links

Railway stations on the Isle of Wight
DfT Category F2 stations
Former Isle of Wight Railway stations
Railway stations in Great Britain opened in 1864
Island Line railway stations (Isle of Wight)
Ryde